Sawridge 150G is an Indian reserve of the Sawridge First Nation in Alberta, located within the Municipal District of Lesser Slave River No. 124. It is adjacent to the eastern boundary of the town of Slave Lake.

References

Indian reserves in Alberta